Nawaf Al-Harthi (born 12 October 1998) is a Saudi professional footballer who plays as a midfielder for Pro League club Al-Ain.

Career
Al-Harthi started his career with Al-Wehda and was promoted from the youth team to the first team in 2018. On 21 August 2019, he joined Al-Ain on a season-long loan. On 21 October 2020, Al-Harthi joined Al-Ain on a permanent deal.

Career statistics

Club

References

External links 
 

1998 births
Living people
Saudi Arabian footballers
Al-Wehda Club (Mecca) players
Al-Ain FC (Saudi Arabia) players
Association football midfielders
Saudi Professional League players
Saudi First Division League players